Suryan FM is a Tamil language FM radio channel owned by Indian media conglomerate Sun Group. The channel has 10 broadcasting stations in Tamil Nadu . In other states, SUN Group's FM service is known as Red FM 93.5 mostly and Magic FM 106.4.

Radio stations

See also
 List of Tamil-language radio stations

References

Radio stations in Chennai
Radio stations in Tiruchirappalli
Radio stations in Coimbatore
Radio stations in Puducherry
Radio stations in Madurai
Sun Group
Companies with year of establishment missing